The Caspian barbel (Luciobarbus caspius) is a species of Cyprinid fish native to the Kura-Aras watershed in the wider Near East. In Persian, it is called zardak (زردک).

Sources

Barbinae
Cyprinid fish of Asia
Barbs (fish)
Fish described in 1914